S85 may refer to:
 S85 (Berlin), a S-Bahn line
 BMW S85, an automobile engine
 Daihatsu Hijet (S85), a kei truck and microvan
 S85 Zhengzhou–Shaolinsi Expressway, China